Jammu and Kashmir Democratic Freedom Party is a separatist political party launched by Shabir Shah in May 1998.  JKDFP called for tripartite negotiations between India, Pakistan and Kashmir.

See also
 Syed Ali Shah Geelani
 Hurriyat and Problems before Plebiscite
 Kashmir conflict
 2014 Jammu and Kashmir Legislative Assembly election

References

External links
 Party website

Political parties in Jammu and Kashmir
1998 establishments in Jammu and Kashmir
Political parties established in 1998